The 1997 Bucknell Bison football team was an American football team that represented Bucknell University during the 1997 NCAA Division I-AA football season. Bucknell finished second in the Patriot League.

In their third year under head coach Tom Gadd, the Bison compiled a 10–1 record. Hunter Adams, Wally Hurdley and Chris Peer were the team captains.

The Bison outscored opponents 282 to 213. Bucknell's 5–1 conference record placed second in the seven-team Patriot League standings.

Undefeated through the first 10 games of the season, Bucknell did not appear in the national Division I-AA top 25 until the week before its final game, when it was ranked No. 24 for that one week. 

Bucknell played its home games at Christy Mathewson–Memorial Stadium on the university campus in Lewisburg, Pennsylvania.

Schedule

References

Bucknell
Bucknell Bison football seasons
Bucknell Bison football